The Pfänderbahn is a cable car in Bregenz in the Austrian province of Vorarlberg. It connects the valley at 419 meters above sea level with the 1022 meter high mountain station near the Pfänderspitze.

History

Planning

Originally, the establishment of a cog railway was considered, but it was eventually decided for cost and ease of use in times of heavy snow.

Construction and opening
The Pfänderbahn was built from July 1926 to February 1927 and opened on 20 March 1927 by President Michael Hainish. Construction work was undertaken by Adolf Bleichert & Co. of Leipzig. Plans for the station buildings were by Bregenz architect Willibald Braun.

1994 overhaul
In October 1994, the cable car system was extensively overhauled:

 Replacement of gondolas, they are now fully glazed and can accommodate up to 80 people.
 Removal of two supports, providing a higher rope guide.
 Installation of a hydraulic device for cable tension.
 The stations are sliding platforms used to optimally utilize the available space.
 A hydraulic system stabilized the gondola in the parking position so that getting in and out is very easy and accessible for wheelchair users.

The renovations were undertaken by Doppelmayr. In 1998, the Pfänderbahn museum opened.

Specifications
The height difference of 603 meters is covered in a total distance of 2063 meters using a dual aerial tramway. The sloping portions comprises about 1980 meters; the horizontal portion about 80 meters. At an average slope of 31%, the cabins move with a speed of up to twelve feet per second. The journey takes six minutes, with a turnaround of 10 minutes. The gondolas are powered by two 500 kW DC electric motors. Power supply to the cable car is via two separate power supplies. In addition, an emergency generator and batteries are available. Communication between valley and mountain stations is analogous via the cable itself.

References

External links

 Official website
 Website about Bregenz Pfänderbahn trip

Bregenz
Cable cars in Austria
1927 establishments in Austria